The National Council on Alcoholism and Drug Dependence (NCADD) is an American advocacy organization focused on alcoholism, drug addiction and the consequences of alcohol and other drug use. NCADD is built on a foundation of participation by members from the medical, scientific, political and social fields which provides a multi-pronged approach to the disease of alcohol and drug addiction. It has a national network of affiliates.

History 

Marty Mann, the first female to achieve sobriety in Alcoholics Anonymous (AA), organized the National Committee for Education on Alcoholism (NCEA) in 1944, which later became the National Council on Alcoholism (NCA) in 1950 and then NCADD in 1990 to address concern with other drugs. The organization was established to serve a dual purpose: first to have a proactive national education and advocacy program attacking the stigma and misunderstanding about alcoholism, treatment and recovery; second, to operate service centers in communities across the country staffed by professionals helping individuals/families with alcohol problems. Those service centers grew into the NCADD Affiliate Network.

Accomplishments 

 Defined "alcoholism" as a disease and successfully worked for its adoption by the American Medical Association (AMA).
 Formed the American Society of Addiction Medicine (ASAM).
 Created the first workplace-based employee assistance program and published the first EAP Standards and Program Manual.
 Hosted the first public news conference to confront stigma and celebrate recovery with over 50 prominent individuals.
 Established Alcohol Awareness Month.
 Led effort for the 21-year old Minimum Drinking Age Act.
 Leadership role in successful campaign for alcohol beverage container warning labels.
 Successfully advocated for insurance coverage for alcoholism and addiction treatment equal to other illnesses.

References

External links
 
 List of NCADD Affiliates

Addiction organizations in the United States
Organizations established in 1944
Temperance organizations in the United States
Mental health organizations in New York (state)